M. Mohammed (born 3 December 1991) is an Indian cricketer who plays for Tamil Nadu. On 2 November 2018, he took a hat-trick in the match against Madhya Pradesh in the 2018–19 Ranji Trophy.

References

External links
 

1991 births
Living people
Indian cricketers
Tamil Nadu cricketers
People from Dindigul district